Richard Dennis Kaplan (born 10 March 1962) is a South African professional golfer who currently plays on the Sunshine Tour.

Kaplan was born in Johannesburg and currently lives in Sandton, Johannesburg with his wife and two children. He had a decorated amateur career during the 1980s, which included winning the English Men's Open Amateur Stroke Play Championship (Brabazon Trophy) in 1986 and the Southern Transvaal Open Strokeplay in 1984. He also earned his Springbok colors four times.

Kaplan turned professional in 1986 and won for the first time on the Sunshine Tour in 1995. He added three more tour wins between then and 2000. His best year-end finish on the Order of Merit was 9th in 1993, 1994 and 1995.

Kaplan has also competed on the Asian Tour where, in 1996, he won the Royal Thai Classic and finished in the top 20 on the Order of Merit.

Speaking in an interview, Kaplan said that his heroes are Jack Nicklaus because "he's the greatest" and Tiger Woods because "he's becoming the greatest".

Amateur highlights
Springbok Colors 4 Times
1984 Southern Transvaal Open Strokeplay
1986 English Men's Open Amateur Stroke Play Championship

Professional wins (9)

Asian Tour wins (1)

Asian Tour playoff record (1–0)

Sunshine Tour wins (4)

Other wins (4)
1989 (1) Pietersburg Classic
1990 (2) Pietermaritzburg, Nissan Challenge
1991 (1) Pietersburg Classic

Results in World Golf Championships

Team appearances
World Cup (representing South Africa): 1999

External links

South African male golfers
Sunshine Tour golfers
Asian Tour golfers
Golfers from Johannesburg
1962 births
Living people